Gerald McKellar may refer to:

 Gerald Colin McKellar (1903–1970), Australian politician
 Gerald McKellar (rugby union) (1884–1960), New Zealand rugby union player